Kipling House may refer to
Kipling House in Villiers Street in London, part of which was briefly the home of Rudyard Kipling in his younger days
Bateman's, a mansion in East Sussex in England that was the home of Rudyard Kipling in his later years
One of several boarding houses at Haileybury and Imperial Service College, a private school in England